Santa María Tlahuitoltepec is a town and municipality in Oaxaca in south-western Mexico. The municipality covers an area of  km². 
It is part of the Sierra Mixe district within the Sierra Norte de Oaxaca Region.

2010 landslide

Tropical Storm Matthew struck the town in 2010.

References

Municipalities of Oaxaca